William George Young (December 17, 1901 – June 29, 1971) was a guard in the National Football League (NFL) who played for the Green Bay Packers.  Young played his college football at the Ohio State University and played two professional games with the Green Bay Packers in 1929.

References

External links
 NFL.com player page

1901 births
1971 deaths
American football guards
Green Bay Packers players
Ohio State Buckeyes football players
People from Kenton, Ohio
Players of American football from Ohio